Castaway Paradise is a social simulation game created by Dutch indie studio Stolen Couch Games, it launched on Facebook in 2014, iOS on July 2, 2015, Android on January 9, 2015 and on Steam on May 19, 2015. It was released on Xbox One and PlayStation 4 on July 31, 2018. On February 1, 2021, rokaplay GmbH announced that it will release for Nintendo Switch on April 29, 2021.

Gameplay
Just like Animal Crossing, Castaway Paradise follows the player helping the resident animals getting the island into better shape, by repairing its buildings and bridges, and clearing rocks and weeds.
The player can do other tasks in the game, such as catching bugs, fish, collecting sea shells, and garbage that washes onshore, all of which can be sold for in-game currency. Players are also able to grow their own flowers and fruit trees, farm their own crops, decorate the island and their home, and decide what their character wears. Villagers will set quests for the player, and there is roster of tasks to do that changes several times a day, through which the player can gain experience points. There are special events and items for sale on specific days, such as holidays.

Characters

The following is a list of characters:
 Viktoria: Mayor of Castaway Paradise; she is a pig.
 Villagers:
 Angus: During quests Angus sabotages the other islanders in the island.
 Gustave: He once had his own cooking show when he was 8 years old. 
 Francis: He would much rather be in the sea, he is also in love with Olga.
 Amelia: She likes to chat with her friends, snacking on bugs.
 Stevie: A new villager, she is a natural stranger to your island and also likes to go outdoor.

Downloadable Content
There are a total of seven downloadable content packs available, including free theme packs based on "China", "Soccer", "Ranger", "Boutique", and "Hospital", as well as a theme pack based on the Awesomenauts game and a content pack that adds a new NPC named Stevie.

Reviews
The PC version of Castaway Paradise received positive reviews. Gamezebo gave the iOS version a 3.5/5, citing an "endless amount of quests, collectibles, and gameplay even if you don't spend a dime." Steam was critically positive with 126 positive and 5 negative reviews. The PlayStation 4 version of the game received mixed reviews, ranging from 85/100 from PSU to 50/100 from The Sixth Axis. It currently has a metascore of 68.

References

External links
Castaway Paradise on Facebook
Castaway Paradise on App Store
Castaway Paradise on Google Play
Castaway Paradise on Nintendo Switch

Android (operating system) games
Windows games
PlayStation 4 games
Xbox One games
IOS games
Nintendo Switch games
MacOS games
Facebook games
2014 video games
Video games about animals
Video games developed in the Netherlands
Life simulation games
Social simulation video games